Late Night may refer to:

Entertainment
 Late Night (film), a 2019 American comedy film
 The Sims 3: Late Night, a 2010 expansion pack for The Sims 3

Television 
 Late night television, generally United States programming airing after 11:30 pm EST
 Late-night talk show, the most common type of late night television in the United States
 Late Night (franchise), an American late-night talk and variety show airing on NBC
 Late Night with David Letterman (1982–93)
 Late Night with Conan O'Brien (1993–2009)
 Late Night with Jimmy Fallon (2009–14)
 Late Night with Seth Meyers (2014–present)
 Late night anime, anime series broadcast on television late at night or in the early hours of the morning

Music 
 "Late Night" (song), a 2013 song by Foals
 "Late Night", a song by Syd Barrett from the album The Madcap Laughs, 1970
 "Late Night", a song by Odesza from the album A Moment Apart, 2017
 "Late Night", a 2020 song by Peakboy

 Late Nite, a 1989 album by American guitarist Neal Schon

See also
 Late at Night (disambiguation)
 The Late Show (disambiguation)